The Patron Saint of Liars is a 1998 drama television film based on the novel of the same name by Ann Patchett. It tells the story of Rose Abbot, a young woman who abandons her life in California with her husband after finding out she is pregnant. She chooses a home for unwed mothers in Kentucky as her escape, hoping to give her child up for adoption and start over. The film stars Dana Delany, Ellen Burstyn and Clancy Brown. It premiered on April 5, 1998, on CBS.

Cast
 Dana Delany as Rose Cleardon Abbott
 Ellen Burstyn as June Clatterbuck
 Clancy Brown as Son
 Sada Thompson as Sister Evangeline
 Maggie Gyllenhaal as Lorraine Thomas
 Jill Gascoine as Mother Corrine
 Lisa Rieffel as Beatrice
 Marissa Ribisi as Angie
 Debra Christofferson as Sister Bernadette

References

External links
 

1998 television films
1998 films
American drama television films
CBS network films
Films directed by Stephen Gyllenhaal
1998 drama films
Films based on American novels
Films scored by Daniel Licht
1990s English-language films
1990s American films